Sayed Mansur Naderi is a leader (Sayed of Kayan) of a Hazara-Ismaili Shi'a community centred in Baghlan Province of Afghanistan. Like other Ismaili communities in Afghanistan and worldwide, the Baghlan Ismailis do submit to the  spiritual leader of Ismailis worldwide, the Agha Khan, Naderi acts as a figurehead of the local Ismailies till the socio/religious leadership structure is established in the country. This community although Shia is smaller than the mainstream Twelver Shia community in Afghanistan.

Naderi served the Afghan monarchy, later the communist government and served as vice president during Majahiden government and in the 1980s, was expelled from his region by the Taliban, and returned to Baghlan following the fall of the Taliban. He was elected to the Wolesi Jirga (lower house of the Afghan Parliament) in 2005, and was the founder of the Ismaili-based National Solidarity Party of Afghanistan (Paiwand Milli). His son Sayed Jafar Naderi also achieved note as a leader in Baghlan, becoming a warlord and later governor of Baghlan Province during the Soviet occupation of Afghanistan.

His son Sayed Jafar Naderi has been appointed security advisor to Afghan first vice president Abdul Rashid Dostum in 2014.

Sayed Mansoor's daughter Farkhunda Zahra Naderi is a well-known rights activist in Afghanistan and also serves as member of Afghan parliament elected in 2010 with the highest vote from Kabul province.

Sadat Mansoor Naderi, his another son nominated by Afghan president Ashraf Ghani Ahmadzai as Urban Development minister, assumed office on April 22, 2015.

Monarchy era 
During the Afghan monarchy, Sayed Mansur served as Vice President of Parliament under King Mohammed Zahir Shah.

Soviet era 
Following the transition to the communist Democratic Republic of Afghanistan and the Soviet invasion, while the Tajiks and Pashtuns of Baghlan aligned themselves with the insurgent Jamiat-e Islami and Hezb-e Islami Gulbuddin, Sayed Mansur received government funding and arms to form a local militia of his traditionally Ismaili supporters. He became a general and governor of the province with his militia reaching 13,000 troops by 1989, but at the same time secretly collaborated with insurgent groups, allowing them to operate in Baghlan provided they did not interfere with logistics transport in the region.

Taliban era 
During the 1990s Taliban period, Sayed Mansoor Nader and his son Jafar Naderi escaped and took refuge in Bamiyan Province, a heavily Shi'a (though non-Ismaili) area, while sending other family members to France. Mansoor apparently later took refuge in Uzbekistan, as he returned from there to Afghanistan after the fall of the Taliban, in 2002.

See also 
 Sayed Jafar Naderi
 Sadat Mansoor Naderi
 Farkhunda Zahra Naderi
 Sayed Kayan

References

External links 
 Sayed Kayan official site

Afghan Ismailis
Governors of Baghlan Province
Living people
1936 births
Hazara politicians
20th-century Ismailis
21st-century Ismailis